Ronald Ball (December 22, 1927 –  October 1984) was a jazz pianist, composer and arranger, born in Birmingham, England.

Biography
Ball moved to London in 1948, and in the early 1950s he worked both as a bandleader and under Ronnie Scott, Tony Kinsey, Victor Feldman, and Harry Klein. In 1952, he moved to New York City and studied with Lennie Tristano.  At the time, it was his ambition to learn more about the American jazz scene and in the 1950s and 1960s he worked extensively with other jazz musicians. Among the musicians Ball performed with are Chuck Wayne (1952), Dizzy Gillespie, Lee Konitz (1953–55), Kenny Clarke, Hank Mobley, Art Pepper, J.J. Johnson (1956), Kai Winding (1956, 1958), Warne Marsh,(1956–57), Buddy Rich (1958), Gene Krupa (1958), Roy Eldridge (1959) and Chris Connor (1961–63).

Ball plays on the Warne Marsh album Jazz of Two Cities (recorded during October 1956 in Los Angeles) with Marsh and Ted Brown (tenor saxophone), Ben Tucker (bass), and Jeff Morton (drums). It was later reissued on Tristano/Marsh Capitol compilation Intuition (Capitol CDP 7243 8 52771 2 2).

During a two-year period (1961-1963), Ball occasionally accompanied American jazz singer Chris Connor and made recordings with her on many occasions.  As most of his adult life was spent in New York, he only made a small number of recordings in London and very little recorded material was reissued on CD. Later in the 1960s, Ball worked as part of the house trio at the Studio 51 Club on Great Newport Street in London.  He ended his musical career to work completing transcriptions for a music publisher until his death in 1984.

Death
Ball died in New York City in October 1984, aged 56.  His exact date of death is unknown.

Discography
With Kenny Clarke
Klook's Clique (Savoy, 1956) 
With Teddy Edwards
Sunset Eyes (Pacific Jazz, 1960)
With Roy Eldridge
Swingin' on the Town (Verve, 1960)
With Lee Konitz
Lee Konitz at Storyville (Storyville, 1954)
Konitz (Storyvile, 1954)
Lee Konitz in Harvard Square (Storyvile, 1954)
With Warne Marsh
Jazz of Two Cities (Imperial, 1956)
Art Pepper with Warne Marsh (Contemporary, 1956 [1986]) with Art Pepper
Music for Prancing (Mode, 1957)
Warne Marsh (Atlantic, 1958)

References
Footnotes

Further reading
[ Ronnie Ball] at Allmusic
Leonard Feather and Ira Gitler, The Biographical Encyclopedia of Jazz. Oxford, 1999, p. 34.

1927 births
1984 deaths
English jazz pianists
People from Birmingham, West Midlands
Savoy Records artists
20th-century pianists
20th-century English musicians